Gabrielle is the French feminine form of the given name Gabriel which translates to "Woman of God" and "God is my strong man".

People with the given name Gabrielle
Gabrielle (singer) (born 1969), English singer
Gabrielle Andrews (born 1996), American tennis player
Gabrielle Anwar (born 1970), English actress
Gabrielle Aplin (born 1992), English singer-songwriter
Gabrielle Armstrong-Scott, New Zealand platform diver
Gabrielle-Suzanne Barbot de Villeneuve (1695–1755), French author
Gabrielle Beaumont (born 1942), British film and television director
Gabrielle Bell (born 1976), British-born American alternative cartoonist
Gabrielle Bellocq (1920–1999), French artist
Gabrielle Bertrand (1923–1999), Canadian politician
Gabrielle Blunt (1919–2014), English actress
Gabrielle Bossis (1874–1950), French nun
Gabrielle Bou Rached (born 1985), Lebanese model and actress
Gabrielle Brooks (born 1990), English actress
Gabrielle Brune (1912–2005), English actress
Gabrielle Carey (born 1959), Australian writer
Gabrielle Carteris (born 1961), American actress
Coco Chanel, Gabrielle Bonheur Chanel, (1883–1971), French fashion designer
Gabrielle Christian (born 1984), American actress and singer
Gabrielle Colonna-Romano (1888–1981), French stage and film actress
Gabrielle Daye (1911–2005), English television and film actress
Gabrielle Destroismaisons (born 1982), Canadian singer
Gabrielle Dorziat (1880–1979), French stage and film actress
Gabby Douglas, Gabrielle Douglas (born 1995), American gymnast and Olympian
Gabrielle Drake (born 1944), English actress
Gabrielle d'Estrées (1573–1599), French mistress of King Henry IV of France
Gabrielle Ferrari (1851–1921), French-Italian pianist and composer
Gabrielle Fitzpatrick (born 1967), Australian film and television actress
Gabrielle Fontan (1873–1959), French stage and film actress
Gabrielle Gachet (born 1980), Swiss ski mountaineer
Gabby Giffords (born 1970), American politician
Gabrielle Glaister (born 1960), English actress
Gabrielle Gutierrez (born 2005), American actress
Gabrielle Hanna, known as Gabbie Hanna (born 1991), American Internet personality, author, singer-songwriter and actress
Gabrielle Harrison (born 1964), Australian politician
Gabrielle Kirk McDonald (born 1942), American lawyer and jurist
Gabrielle LeDoux (born 1948), American politician
Gabrielle Léger (1916–1998), Canadian wife of the 21st Governor General of Canada, Jules Léger
Gabrielle Leithaug (born 1985), Norwegian pop singer
Gabrielle Lester, English classical violinist and orchestra leader
Gabrielle Lord (born 1946), Australian crime writer
Gabrielle Louis-Carabin (born 1946) Guadeloupe politician and member of the National Assembly of France
Gabrielle Lutz (born 1935), French slalom and sprint canoer
Gabrielle Miller (born 1973), Canadian actress
Gabrielle Miller (Australian actress) (born 1986), Australian actress
Gabriele Oettingen (born 1953), German noblewoman, academic, and psychologist
Gabrielle Onguene (born 1989), Cameroonian footballer, Olympic athlete
Gabrielle Petit (1893–1916), Belgian spy for the British Secret Service during WWI
Gabrielle Petit (feminist) (1860–1952), French feminist activist, anticlerical, libertarian socialist, newspaper editor
Gabrielle Petito (1999–2021), American crime victim
Gabrielle Pizzi (1940–2004), Australian art dealer
Gabrielle Radziwill (1877–1968), Lithuanian noblewoman, nurse, and women's rights activist
Gabrielle Ray (1883–1973), English stage actress, dancer and singer
Gabrielle Reece (born 1970), American professional volleyball player and model
Gabrielle Réjane (1856–1920), French stage and film actress
Gabrielle Renaudot Flammarion (1877–1962), French astronomer
Gabrielle Réval (1869-1938), French novelist, essayist
Gabrielle Richens (born 1974), English model and television personality
Gabrielle Robinne (1886–1980), French stage and film actress
Gabrielle de Rochechouart de Mortemart, (1633–1693), Marchioness of Thianges and French noblewoman
Gabrielle Rose (actress) (born 1954), Canadian actress
Gabrielle Rose (swimmer) (born 1977), American-Brazilian freestyle, medley and breaststroke swimmer and Olympic athlete
Gabrielle Elizabeth Frances Ross (born 1975), British fashion designer and businesswoman 
Gabrielle Roth (born 1941), American dancer, author and musician
Gabrielle Roy (1909–1983), Canadian author
Gabrielle Scollay (born 1990) Australian actress
Gabrielle M. Spiegel (born 1943), American professor, historian of medieval France
Gabrielle Stanton (born 1968), American television producer and screenwriter
Gabrielle Suchon (1631–1703), French moral philosopher and Catholic feminist
Gabrielle Thomas (born 1996), American sprinter
Gabrielle Tuite (born 1977), American model and actress
Gabrielle Union (born 1972), American actress
Gabrielle Upton (born 1964), Australian politician
Gabrielle Upton (screenwriter) (1921–2022), Canadian-born American screenwriter and actress
Gabrielle Walcott (born 1984), Trinidad and Tobago model and beauty pageant contestant
Gabrielle Weidner (1914–1945), Dutch resistance fighter who played active role in the French Resistance movement during the World War II
Gabrielle West (born 1985), American actress
Gabrielle Wortman (born 1989), American rock musician
Gabrielle Zevin (born 1977), American author and screenwriter
Gabrielle van Zuylen (1933–2010), French garden designer and garden writer

Fictional characters
Gabrielle (Xena: Warrior Princess), from the television series Xena: Warrior Princess
Gabrielle Delacour, Fleur Delacour's sister in the Harry Potter series
Gabrielle de Lioncourt, Lestat de Lioncourt's mortal mother and vampire daughter
Gabrielle Solis, one of the housewives in Desperate Housewives

References

French feminine given names